Pinedale may refer to:

Geography

Pinedale, Alberta, Canada
United States:
Pinedale, Arizona
Pinedale, California
Pinedale, New Mexico
Pinedale, Wyoming

Science
Pinedale glaciation

See also
 Pinedale Shores, Alabama (disambiguation)